Pablo Lorenzini Basso (born 25 October 1949) is a Chilean politician currently serving as a member of the Chamber of Deputies, representing District 38 of the Maule Region. He previously served as President of the Chamber of Deputies.

References

1949 births
Living people
Christian Democratic Party (Chile) politicians
Members of the Chamber of Deputies of Chile
Presidents of the Chamber of Deputies of Chile
University of Chile alumni